Akhtar Mohammad Mansour (1960s21 May 2016) was the second supreme leader of the Taliban, an Islamic fundamentalist political movement in Afghanistan. Succeeding the founding leader, Mullah Omar, he was the supreme leader from July 2015 to May 2016, when he was killed in a US drone strike in Balochistan, Pakistan.

United States president Barack Obama stated that Mansour was killed because he was planning attacks on US targets in Kabul. Obama hoped Mansour's death would lead to the Taliban joining a peace process.

Personal life

Mansour was born sometime during either 1960, 1963, 1965 or 1968. According to the Taliban, he is thought to have been born either in a village named Kariz or another village named Band-i-Taimoor, both of which are situated within the Maiwand District of Kandahar Province in southern Afghanistan. The biography released on a Taliban website showed his date of birth as 1347 in the solar Hijri calendar, which corresponds to 1968. This year is corroborated by S. Mehsud, of the C.T.C. West Point. According to Ahmed Rashid, Mansour belonged to the Alizai tribe, but other sources claim that he was of the Ishaqzai tribe, in any case, both the Alizai and the Ishaqzai are of the Durrani line of Pashtuns. According to the Taliban, Mansoor was educated at a village mosque and joined primary school at about the age of seven.

Mansour is alleged to have owned a cell-phone company, among other investments, and is claimed to have been wealthy as a result of his profiting from the dealings of Ishaqzai drug dealers. According to Richard Spencer of The Daily Telegraph, Mansour performed his business operations via a residence located in Dubai.

An undamaged Pakistani passport in the name of "Wali Muhammad" was recovered near the burned-out car at the scene of the drone attack that killed him; the passport is believed to have belonged to Mansour.

Soviet war and mujahideen era

Sometime in 1985, he joined the jihadi war against the Soviet invasion of Afghanistan, participating in the Mohammad Nabi Mohammadi group. During the same time Mohammad Omar was a commander of an organization within Mohammad Nabi Mohammadi. Mansour participated in the war against the Soviet military within Maiwand, Sang-e-Hessar, Zangawat and other parts of the city, and the Pashmul area of the Panjwai district, under the command of Mohammad Hassan Akhond, apparently commanded by him at least while fighting at the last location. During 1987 he was apparently injured, sustaining 13 separate wounds while stationed at Sanzary area of Panjwai district in Kandahar, according to the Taliban. Known as one of the prominent warriors, Mansour joined the Maulvi Obaidullah Ishaqzai group in 1987 but later Ishaqzai surrendered to Nur ul-Haq Ulumi, now the interior minister. Soon afterwards, he migrated to Quetta in Pakistan.

After the war, Mansour resumed his religious education in different seminaries and later shifted to Peshawar, Pakistan, where he joined Jamia Mohammadia at the Jalozai Refugee camp. He was a student at Darul Uloom Haqqania madrassa. He was apparently a popular student, during his time at the madrassa from 1994 to 1995, located within the Jalozai refugee camp for Afghans near Peshawar, according to Afghan journalist Sami Yousafzai, who met him during that time.

Islamic Emirate of Afghanistan
After the capture of Kandahar airport he was appointed as director general, or otherwise termed, security officer in charge, of the Kandahar airport, a role which encompassed both the air force and air-defence systems of Kandahar. After the taking of Kabul during 1996 he was made director of Ariana airlines, and additionally Minister of the Emirate for aviation and tourism, by Mohammed Omar, within the Talebani Islamic Emirate of Afghanistan, together with his overseeing the Emirates' air force and air-defence systems, from his additional appointment as head of these within the ministry of defence. Notably, while minister, Mansour organized a 24-hour flight services within Afghanistan, thereby organizing the provision of facilities for Muslims to go to Mecca as Hajj via air-flight. During 1996, Mullah Omar appointed Farid Ahmed to station manager of Ariana airlines.

During 1997, when the Taliban tried unsuccessfully to capture the northern city of Mazar-e-Sharif, Mansour was captured by an Uzbek warlord. For two months he remained there as a prisoner of war, before Mohammed Omar negotiated his release in a prisoner swap.

During 1998, the Mullah visited Frankfurt, Germany, and Prague, Czech Republic, during a 25-day trip visit to the unofficial envoy to Europe at the time, Mullah Nek Muhammad:

After the conclusion of the hijacking of Indian Airlines Flight 814, Mansour was reported, by Anand Arni, a former officer with the Indian organisation Research & Analysis Wing, as being seen embracing Maulana Masood Azhar, the then leader of Jaish-e-Mohammed.

In 2001, he surrendered to the Afghan President Hamid Karzai to ask for amnesty. He was forgiven after which he returned to his home district. However, American forces, refusing to believe he and other senior Taliban commanders had given up fighting, conducted a series of night raids to capture him after which he fled to Pakistan, where he helped to shape the Taliban as an insurgent organisation.

Mullah Mansour was appointed as shadow governor of Kandahar, from sometime after 2001, until May 2007.

In a previously secret state communication of the U.S. government in 2006, Akhtar Mansour was listed as the 23rd member of the Taliban (with the late Mohammed Omar as the first member).

2007 and later

Quetta Shura and Taliban insurgency

According to leaked material, Mansour attended a meeting dated 24 August 2007 with other senior Taliban officials, so that he and those others present might discuss and organize a potential suicide bombing and bombing campaign upon the areas of Kandahar and the Helmand Province, and also particularly focused on killing Ahmad Wali Karzai and Hamid Karzai.

The council of the Taliban appointed him as deputy to the newly appointed Mullah Abdul Ghani Baradar during 2007, the Indian Express reported Akthar Mansour as appointed to the Taliban's Quetta Shura (council for political and military matters and affairs), sometime during 2007, while within Quetta. One source gives Mansour as being appointed deputy to Mohammed Omar during 2010; another source states him to have been "by some accounts" the second most senior member of the Taliban behind Mohammed Omar, during 2010. A contradictory report states his appointment occurred during 2013 after Abdul Ghani Baradar, the then deputy, was jailed. A source claims to know of Akther Mansour having a "direct influence" over military units operating within Khost, Paktia and Paktika, at a time after his appointment to the Council of the Taliban.

2011

Listed by the United Nations for sanctioning
In a communique published 29 November 2011, the Mullah was identified with the reference number TI.M.11.01. as an individual associated with the Taliban and accordingly was made pursuant to sanctions, as of 25 January 2001, and those sanctioned were to have any available assets frozen, to be banned from traveling and to be subject to an arms embargo.

2013 – June 2015
Wahid Muzhda is quoted as saying of Mansour:

 a fact which is corroborated by an additional report, which states the office was in Doha, Qatar.

According to a 2014 report, Mansour, together with Abdul Qayum Zakir and Gul Agha Ishakzai, were involved in fighting over control of a major opium-producing area (land of Maiwand District) against a co-founder of the Taliban movement, Abdul Ghani Baradar.

An article published on 12 March 2015 said Mansour and Abdul Qayum Zakir, who were long-term rivals, had met together in order to find an agreement and at the meeting had slaughtered sheep for a feast. The article stated Mansour was in favour of initiating so-called talks with Afghani government officials at the time, but was unable to make any progress in his own direction due to opposition from Zakir to the opening of a dialogue with the Afghan government.

According to one report, dated 17 March 2015, Mansour was at that time deputy amir ul-momenin, military leader and head of the shura of Quetta.

Mansour wrote a letter to Abu Bakr al-Baghdadi, on behalf of the Islamic Emirate of Afghanistan, released on 16 June 2015, to express his concerns of the potential for a negative influence of ISIS upon Afghan Talibans' progress, since ISIS activities might pose a risk of causing "multiplicity" within forces of the jihad of Afghanistan. The letter, appealing to the unity of "religious brotherhood", requests al-Baghdadi might extend "goodwill" to the Taliban, which "doesn't want to see interference in its affairs". The letter was written in Pashto and released within the Voice of Jihad site.

Additionally, the letter shows Mansour considered the late (Sheikhs) Abdullah Azzam and Osama bin Laden, the late Abu Musab al Zarqawi and Ibn al-Khattab, to be heroes. In addition the letter expresses recognition of the support to the Islamic Emirate of Afghanistan, of "famous religious scholars", of these he provides (Sheikh) Hamud bin Uqla al Shuaybi as an example.

July 2015 – May 2016

Leader of the Taliban

Akhtar Mansour was elected leader of the Taliban organisation on 29 July 2015. The results were announced on Thursday 30 July.

Internal dissent
Taliban splinter group Fidai Mahaz claimed Mohammed Omar was assassinated in a coup led by Akhtar Mansour and Gul Agha. Mansoor Dadullah, a Taliban commander and the brother of former senior commander Dadullah, also claimed that Omar had been assassinated. Mohammad Yaqoob, Omar's eldest son, denied that his father had been killed, insisting that he died of natural causes. A Taliban communique published 30 July 2015 said that Omar had died in hospital.

Mullah Mansour is said to have "closely kept the secret that Mullah Omar had been dead" despite the leaking of a report of Omar's death in 2013.

Dissension
Some Taliban members considered Mansour's selection as leader to be invalid because not all Taliban were involved in the decision. Other senior Taliban commanders and officials wanted Omar's son Yaqoob as leader. Yaqoob was said to have been supported by his father's younger brother Abdul Manan, and former Taliban military chief Abdul Qayyum Zakir. The head of the Talibans' political office in Qatar, Tayyab Agha, also opposed the selection of Mansour as leader. However, a statement allegedly from Zakir denied he had any conflict with Mansour. Yaqoob is known to have publicly rejected the appointment of Mansour.

Features of Mansour's leadership
Mansour announced one of his deputies to be Sirajuddin Haqqani.

Mansour is thought to have had dealings of some kind with the Pakistani Inter-Services Intelligence.

On 13 August 2015, al-Qaeda's media wing As-Sahab issued a pledge of allegiance from Ayman al-Zawahiri to Mansour.

Sometime in August, Mansour sent a delegation to meetings with officials of the Afghan government, which was subsequently "hailed as a breakthrough".

A Security Council report, dated to the immediate September after Mansour's inauguration, showed he, as the new leader, was unwilling to engage in negotiations for the purposes of assuring peace.

The Brookings Institution reported that Mansour referred to his own leadership as Commander of the faithful, a translation of Amir al-Mu'minin. A separate source states Mansour used this particular title to refer to his role as leader of jihad. Mansour was, according to RAND corporation, and elsewhere, leading a jihad (i.e. an insurgent force) limited to concerns orientated only to within Afghanistan, and not elsewhere.

Communications
According to a report published on 5 November 2015, Mansour stated his opinion that modern education was a "necessity".

Mansour released his first communication as leader of the Taliban on 1 August 2015 as part of a 30-minute (or 33-minute, according to Al Jazeera) video release:

Mansour stated his position with regards to peace talks; the suggestion of his being willing to engage in peace talks as "enemy propaganda".

The website of the Islamic Emirate of Afghanistan published a biography of Mansour when he became Emir.

Death

Mansour was being driven to Quetta, after a long stay in Iran, reportedly to both visit family and seek medical treatment. The CIA had learned of Mansour's location via electronic intercepts, and the movements of his vehicle were tracked using signals intelligence provided by the NSA. Mansour had crossed into Pakistan posing as a Pakistani citizen, using forged identity documents (a Pakistani passport and national ID card under the name "Muhammad Wali.") The false passport showed that Mansour had entered Iran on 28 March. Mansour and his taxi driver were both killed in the strike against the Toyota Corolla, which was struck by two Hellfire missiles launched by Reaper drones that had evaded Pakistani radar.

The following day, U.S. Secretary of State John Kerry announced that the United States had "conducted a precision airstrike that targeted Taliban leader Mullah Mansour in a remote area of the Afghanistan-Pakistan border" against Mansour that had likely killed him, and stated that Mansour "posed a continuing, imminent threat" to U.S. personnel and Afghans. Kerry said that the leaders of both Pakistan and Afghanistan were made aware of the airstrike but did not comment on the timing of the notifications, which he said included a telephone call from him to Pakistani Prime Minister Nawaz Sharif. The Pakistani government later said it was notified of the strike seven hours after it took place. On 23 May 2016, U.S. President Barack Obama confirmed that Mansour had been killed in the American airstrike that he had sanctioned, and stated that Mansour had been planning attacks against U.S. targets in Kabul. Obama stated afterwards that he had hoped Mansour's death would lead to the Taliban joining a peace process. The death of Mansour was also later officially confirmed separately by the Afghan government and members of the Taliban.

The U.S. government agencies involved reportedly agreed that officials were to be vague about identifying the location of the strike, beyond saying it took place in the Afghanistan-Pakistan border region. The strike that killed Mansour was a rare instance of a U.S. drone strike in Balochistan; U.S. strikes in Pakistan were more generally limited to the Federally Administered Tribal Areas.

Two senior members of the Taliban said that Pakistani authorities had delivered Mansour’s badly burned body to the Taliban for its burial in Quetta, Balochistan. Pakistani officials, however, denied handing over a body. Mansour's body was later handed over to his relatives in Afghanistan.

Succession and impact
Mansour was succeeded as Taliban leader by Hibatullah Akhundzada.

Some U.S. officials had been divided over Mansour's intentions. Some believed that Mansour could have brought the Taliban to the negotiating table, potentially speeding up the reconciliation process; others, by contrast, "were highly skeptical of Mansour's commitment to talks," noting that Mansour had a long history of authorizing suicide attacks, including in the weeks before the drone strike (such as the April 2016 Kabul attack, which killed more than 60 people), and that even as Mansour was agreeing to secret direct peace negotiations, he had rejected international peace efforts. According to the International Institute for Counter-Terrorism, U.S. officials stated that Mullah Mansour's death was "unavoidable" due to the then Emir being unwilling to engage in peace talks.

Timeline
The following is a list of reported information:
Born sometime during either 1960, 1963, 1965 or 1968.
Joined war against Soviet invasion during 1985.
Joined Maulvi Obaidullah Ishaqzai during 1987.
Injured during battle during 1987.
Student at Darul Uloom Haqqania madrassa 1994–1995.
Made director of Ariana airlines during 1996.
Sometime during 1996 appointed to Minister of Civil Aviation (including both domestic and military flights), Transportation, Tourism.
Injured during battle May 1997.
Visited Europe during 1998.
Listed for sanctioning by the United Nations as of 25 January 2001.
Known to be involved in activities identified as terrorist within the provinces of Khost, Paktia and Paktika, Afghanistan as of May 2007.
Made Governor of Kandahar by the then powers of the Taliban, as of May 2007.
Attendee of meeting (2007) to organize bombing campaign to kill Ahmad Wali Karzai and Hamid Karzai.
Appointed to the Quetta Shura sometime during 2007.
Deputy to Mullah Abdul Ghani Baradar in the Taliban Supreme Council as of 2009.
Temporarily in charge of the Taliban Supreme Council from February 2011.
Identified as involved within the trafficking of illegal drugs, principally through Gerd-e-Jangal (within Afghanistan); 2011.
Public statement as leader of Taliban as of 30 July 2015.
During August and September 2015, the Mullah had sent a request to Mullah Dadullah to leave Zabul, using the Taliban shadow governor for Zabul, and subsequently sent fighters against the non-allegiant Mullah Dadullah.

See also
Caliphs
Kunduz
Mohammad Rabbani
Sahib
Sharia law

Notes

References

External links
 Peter Tomsen, The Wars of Afghanistan: Messianic Terrorism, Tribal Conflicts, and the Failures of Great Powers (PublicAffairs, 2013), 

1960s births
2016 deaths
Afghan expatriates in Pakistan
Afghan Sunni Muslims
Deaths by drone strikes of the Central Intelligence Agency in Pakistan
Pashtun people
People from Kandahar Province
Taliban government ministers of Afghanistan
Supreme leaders of Afghanistan